In the 2012–13 season, the Leinster Senior League Senior Divisionan Irish regional football leaguewas won by Crumlin United F.C.

Final table

Results

References

Leinster Senior League Senior Division seasons
3
3
Ire